"Strong Enough to Bend" is a song written by Beth Nielsen Chapman and Don Schlitz, and recorded by American country music artist Tanya Tucker.  It was released in June 1988 as the first single and title track from the album Strong Enough to Bend.  The song was Tucker's ninth number one on the country chart as a solo artist.  The single went to number one for one week and spent a total of fifteen weeks on the country chart.

Charts

Weekly charts

Year-end charts

References
 

1988 singles
1988 songs
Tanya Tucker songs
Songs written by Don Schlitz
Songs written by Beth Nielsen Chapman
Capitol Records Nashville singles
Music videos directed by John Lloyd Miller
Song recordings produced by Jerry Crutchfield